Christopher Charles Pappas (born June 4, 1980) is an American politician who has been the U.S. representative from New Hampshire's 1st congressional district since 2019. From 2013 to 2019, he represented the 4th district on the New Hampshire Executive Council. The district includes Manchester, two towns in Hillsborough, six towns in Merrimack, eight towns in Rockingham, and two towns in Strafford County.

A member of the New Hampshire Democratic Party, Pappas was a candidate for the U.S. House of Representatives in the 2018 election to succeed Carol Shea-Porter. He was elected on November 6, 2018, and is the first openly gay man to represent New Hampshire in Congress.

Early life and education 
Pappas was born in Manchester, the son of Dawn and Arthur Pappas. His paternal great-grandfather, also named Arthur Pappas, arrived in New Hampshire as a new American citizen in the early 20th century, having recently emigrated from Greece. In 1917 Arthur Pappas and his cousin Louis Canota founded an ice cream shop in Manchester. By 1919 they had expanded the business into a restaurant, now known as the Puritan Backroom, and in 1949 they added a function room. In 1974 Charlie Pappas, grandfather of Chris Pappas and co-owner of the Puritan at the time, invented the chicken tender. The business remains family-owned, and as of 2020 Chris Pappas was one of the owners.

Pappas graduated from Manchester Central High School in 1998. He then attended Harvard College, where he wrote for The Harvard Crimson. He earned his Bachelor of Arts in government in 2002.

Early political career 
In 1996, while in high school, Pappas met then-State Senator Jeanne Shaheen, who was running for governor at the time. He signed on as a volunteer for Shaheen's campaign, marking his first foray into politics.

First elected in 2002, Pappas served two terms in the New Hampshire House of Representatives.

In 2006, Pappas was elected to the first of two terms as treasurer of Hillsborough County. In 2010 he lost reelection to Robert Burns.

In 2012, Pappas was elected to the New Hampshire Executive Council, defeating Burns. He was reelected in 2014 and 2016.

In 2016, Pappas voted to extend substance abuse treatment to 140,000 New Hampshire residents. He also supported increased funding for substance abuse prevention, treatment, and recovery.

U.S. House of Representatives

Elections

2018 

For years, Pappas was floated as a potential candidate for the U.S. House of Representatives, for U.S. Senator, or for governor of New Hampshire. After U.S. Representative Carol Shea-Porter announced that she would not seek reelection in 2018, Pappas announced his candidacy for her seat, representing New Hampshire's 1st congressional district.

In the September 12 Democratic primary, Pappas defeated ten other candidates, including former Assistant to the Secretary of Defense for Public Affairs Maura Sullivan and Bernie Sanders's son Levi Sanders, with 42.2% of the vote.

Pappas defeated Republican Eddie Edwards, a former member of the New Hampshire State Division of Liquor Enforcement and former police chief, in the general election, with 53.6% of the vote. He won every county except Belknap County.

2020 

Pappas ran for reelection to a second term and was unopposed in the Democratic primary. He defeated Republican Matt Mowers, the former Executive Director of the New Hampshire Republican Party and a former U.S. State Department staffer, in the general election, receiving 51.32% of the vote.

2022 

Pappas was reelected in 2022, defeating Karoline Leavitt with 54% of the vote.

Committee assignments 
 Committee on Transportation and Infrastructure
 Subcommittee on Coast Guard and Maritime Transportation
 Subcommittee on Highways and Transit
 Subcommittee on Water Resources and Environment
 Committee on Veterans' Affairs
 Subcommittee on Economic Opportunity
 Subcommittee on Oversight and Investigations (Chair)
Committee on Small Business

Caucus memberships 
 Congressional LGBT Equality Caucus (Co-Chair)
New Democrat Coalition
 Tom Lantos Human Rights Commission
 House Pro-Choice Caucus

Political positions 

As of June 2022, Pappas had voted in line with President Joe Biden's stated position 100% of the time.

Pappas was one of six House Democrats to vote against the Marijuana Opportunity Reinvestment and Expungement (MORE) Act to legalize cannabis at the federal level in 2020. Pappas said he supports removing cannabis from the Controlled Substances Act but that he had concerns with other provisions of the bill and felt that it was being rushed through.

In August 2022, Pappas criticized President Biden's plan to cancel $10,000 in federal student debt for those making less than $125,000 and up to $20,000 for Pell Grant recipients, calling it "no way to make policy", and saying it did little to address the root cause of increasing costs of higher education.

On February 1, 2023, Pappas was among twelve Democrats to vote for a resolution to end COVID-19 national emergency.

Syria 
In 2023, Pappas voted against H.Con.Res. 21 which directed President Joe Biden to remove U.S. troops from Syria within 180 days.

Electoral history

Personal life 
Pappas co-owns the Puritan Backroom restaurant in Manchester. The Puritan Backroom is well-known in New Hampshire as a frequent stop for presidential candidates during the New Hampshire primary.

Pappas is an Orthodox Christian and is affiliated with the Greek Orthodox Archdiocese of America.

Pappas is gay, and became engaged to Vann Bentley in 2021. They got married in February 2023.

References

External links

Congressman Chris Pappas official U.S. House website
Campaign website

|-

1980 births
Living people
American people of Greek descent
Democratic Party members of the United States House of Representatives from New Hampshire
Gay politicians
Harvard College alumni
LGBT members of the United States Congress
LGBT state legislators in New Hampshire
Manchester Central High School alumni
Members of the Executive Council of New Hampshire
Democratic Party members of the New Hampshire House of Representatives
Politicians from Manchester, New Hampshire
21st-century LGBT people
LGBT people from New Hampshire
Eastern Orthodox Christians from the United States
Greek Orthodox Christians from the United States
LGBT Christians